Bełk may refer to the following places:
Bełk, Silesian Voivodeship (south Poland)
Bełk, Świętokrzyskie Voivodeship (south-central Poland)
Bełk, Warmian-Masurian Voivodeship (north Poland)
Belk, Alabama
Belk, Tennessee